R Adams Cowley (July 25, 1917 – October 27, 1991) was an American surgeon considered a pioneer in emergency medicine and the treatment of shock trauma. Called the "Father of Trauma Medicine", he was the founder of the United States' first trauma center at the University of Maryland in 1958, after the US Army awarded him $100,000 to study shock in people—the first award of its kind in the United States. The trauma unit at first consisted of two beds, and was later expanded to four beds. Many people called the four-bed unit the "death lab." Cowley was the creator of the "Golden Hour" concept, the period of 60 minutes or less following injury when immediate definitive care is crucial to a trauma patient's survival. He was a leader in the use of helicopters for medical evacuations of civilians, beginning in 1969, and founded the Society of Thoracic Surgeons. He also founded the nation's first statewide EMS system, called MIEMSS by Executive Order of Maryland's Governor Mandel, 1972, as well as the National Study Center for Trauma and EMS, enacted by Congress in 1986 and signed into law by President Ronald Reagan. He is also known for being one of the first surgeons to perform open-heart surgery and invented both a surgical clamp that bears his name and the prototype pacemaker that was used by Dwight D. Eisenhower.

Career

As a Professor of Thoracic Surgery, University of Maryland, Cowley was the organizer of the world's first and longest-running, "Shock Trauma" Center. After years of research which he conducted in the late 1950s, it was officially opened at the University of Maryland Hospital in 1959. The center was renamed May 1989 "The R Adams Cowley Shock Trauma Center of the University of Maryland Hospital." During his years in the Army, Cowley pioneered in 1957, the once-controversial, but now universally-accepted, the concept of the "Golden Hour," which he defined as the fact that a severe trauma patient had 60 minutes or less from time of injury to receive specialized treatment at a Shock Trauma Unit to reduce mortality. The controversial aspect was that for countless years, injured patients had been taken, by ambulance, to the nearest hospital to die. To accomplish his goal, Cowley delegated, and shared responsibility for, Trauma Medicine with such hospitals throughout the state of Maryland as the Johns Hopkins Hospital's Pediatric Trauma Center, the Curtis Hand Center of Union Memorial Hospital, and the state burn center at Bayview Hospital. Cowley also organized the "Maryland Institute of Emergency Medical Services," the first statewide coordinated EMS system of care in The United States. In 1969, he started the first injured "civilian" helicopter transport service with the assistance of the Maryland State Police Aviation Division. With over 400 published professional articles, chapters, books, and white papers to his credit, Cowley was a pioneer in raising awareness of trauma prevention. Notably, Cowley took on Dr. David Boyd in his residency, and mentored him. Boyd went on to further develop the Trauma system with his successes in the Illinois Trauma Center. In 1986, at Cowley's request and with the support of Maryland Senator Mathias, Ronald Reagan, the then President of the United States, signed the act authorizing the establishment of "The National Center For The Study of Trauma and Emergency Medical Services" and recognizing, as its founder and first director, R Adams Cowley. This center, still in operation as of early April 2015, is located at the University of Maryland. The University of Utah, which honored Cowley as one of Utah's most famous legends, requested and received the collection of his personal and professional papers.

Military awards
 Congressional Certificate of Merit, Congress of the United States of America, March 19, 1980.
 World War II Victory Medal.
 World War II Army Occupation Medal.
 Appreciation for services rendered from the FBI, United States Department of Justice, December 1983.
 House Bill, June 11, 2013, to award a Congressional Gold Medal to R Adams Cowley in recognition of lifelong commitment to the advancement of trauma care. Sponsored by Dutch Ruppersberger and all Maryland Congressional members.
 Senate Bill, June 11, 2013, to award Congressional Gold Medal to R Adams Cowley in recognition of lifelong commitment to the advancement of trauma care. Sponsored by Senator Barbara Mikulski and Senator Cardin.

Titles

 Professor of Thoracic & Cardiovascular Surgery, University of Maryland, School of Medicine
 Clinical Professor of Medicine, Pennsylvania State University
 Founder/First Director  Maryland Institute for Emergency Medical Services Systems
 Director, Charles McC. Mathias, Jr., National Study Center for Trauma & Emergency Medicine. Approved by US Senate and House and signed into law by President Ronald Reagan.

Memberships
 National Highway Safety Advisory Committee (Presidential appointee)
 National Coalition for EMS (chairman)
 White House Conference on Emergency Medical Services
 Society of Thoracic Surgeons (founding member)
 American Trauma Society (founding member and past president)
 Atlantic EMS Council (founding member and past president)
 Maryland State Highway Safety Coordinating Committee
 Governors Commission of Fire Services
 National Research Council: Committees on Shock, Hyperbaric Oxygenation and blood components

Publications
More than 400 medical journal articles.
 Textbooks: Trauma Care: Surgical Management; Trauma Care: Medical Management; Shock Trauma/Critical Care Handbook; Terrorism, Mass Casualties, Crisis: A Lessons Learned Approach; Emergency Management at an Airport Catastrophe; Shock Trauma/Critical Care Manual; Initial Assessment and Management; Pathophysiology of Shock, Anoxia and Ischemia; and collected papers in Emergency Medical Services and Traumatology.
 Editorial boards: Disaster Medicine; Journal of World Association for Emergency & Disaster Medicine; American Journal of Emergency Medicine; Emergency Department News.

White papers
 "Accidental Death and Disability: The Neglected Disease of Modern Society." (He was a member of the committee of the National Research Council that wrote the landmark document.)
 "The Need for a National Trauma Institute: Conquering Our Most Expensive Health Problem."
 "An Evaluation of the Utilization of Human Blood Resources in the United States."

Papers and memorabilia collected by the University of Utah.

Education
Before he obtained his M.D. degree, Cowley studied in and graduated from the Layton Public Schools of Layton, Utah and Davis County High School in Kaysville, Utah; in 1940, Cowley graduated eighth in his class at the University of Utah. He attended medical school at the University of Maryland, from which he graduated in 1944. Cowley completed a fellowship at the University of Michigan in Ann Arbor, Michigan. In the late 1940s, while serving in the U.S. Army, he received extensive surgical training in Europe.

Honors

 "American Men of Medicine", 1961 (biographical sketches of notable physicians and surgeons who contributed services and scientific skill to the welfare of mankind)
 "National Research Council"
 Committee on Hyperbaric Oxygenation, 1962-1966
 Committee on Shock, 1962-1971
 Committee on Blood Components, 1970
 Consultant to Senator A. Cranston (Chairman Senate Sub-committee on Health) and Senator J. Glenn Beall on Federal EMS Legislation, 1972-1976
 "Chairman, Mid-Atlantic EMS Council, Inc.", 1973-1989
 Mayor's Professional Advisory Committee, 1973-1977
 Credentials Committee, American College of Surgeons, 1974-19890
 "Advisory Panel on National Health Insurance", "Subcommittee on Health, Committee on Ways and Means, U.S.House of Representatives", 1975
 Participant, "White House Conference on Emergency Medical Services", January 6, 1976
 Speaker, Subcommittee on Health on the Emergency Medical Services Systems Act Extension, January 23, 1976
 "Governors Commission on Fire Services", 1974-1975
 "Chairman, American College of Surgeons Postgraduate Course", "Thoracic Trauma and Pulmonary Insufficiency," Boston, Massachusetts.April 1976
 "Sponsor, U.S.A." Bicentennial Emergency Medical Services and Traumatology Conference, May 9–12, 1976.
 Program Chairman, Traumatology Track, U.S.A. Bicentennial Traumatology Conference May 9–12, 1976
 "Project Director, Inner Harbor Disaster Exercise, U.S.A.", 1976
 "Mayors Citation", May 10, 1976
 "Official Citation, Maryland House of Delegates" (House Resolution 461)
 "Governors Citation", April 5, 1977
 Moderator, Thoracic Trauma Symposium, 63rd Clinical Congress, American College of Surgeons.1977
 Presiding Officer, Thoracic Surgery Symposium,63rd Annual American College of Surgeons Clinical Conference, Dallas, Texas, October 1977
 "Distinguished Marylander Award", Advertising Club of Maryland, May 1977
 "Certificate of Distinguished Citizenship", State of Maryland, 1977
 Speaker, House Subcommittee on Consumer Protection and Finance of the Committee on Interstate and Foreign Commerce, September 9, 1977
 "Certificate of Appreciation, Maryland State Firemens Association", 1977/1979
 "Program Director, Emergency Management at an Airport Catastrophe", May 12–13, 1978
 "Presidential Appointee", National Highway Safety Advisory Committee, 1978
 "Governor Appointee", Maryland State Highway Safety Coordinating Committee, 1978
 "William S. Stone Lectureship Award", American Trauma Society, 1978
 "Distinguished Alumni Award" University of Utah, 1979
 Editor, "Emergency Department News,".1980
 "Baltimore's Best Award", January 17, 1980
 "Citation, Maryland Chapter, American College of Emergency Physicians", March 17, 1980
 "Congressional Certificate of Merit, Congress of the United States of America", March 19, 1980
 "Special Award, Developing the Nation's Premier Emergency Medical Services System", Bell Helicopter Textron, March 1990
 "Award for Public Service, National Highway Traffic Safety Administration", March 1980
 "Citation, Outstanding Service", Safety Council of Maryland, June 18, 1980
 Honorary Member, University of Maryland Police Department at Baltimore, 1980
 Chairman, National Coalition for Emergency Medical Services,1980
 Disaster Planning Conference, American Hospital Association, 1981
 Emergency Management Advisory Council, State of Maryland, 1981
 "Honorary Diploma, La Cruz Roja Mexicana y la Association Mexicana de Medicina Critica y Terapia Intensiva", August 1981
 Board of Directors, International Society of Emergency Medical Services, 1981-1982
 "Program Chairman, First International Society Assembly on Emergency Medical Services," June 1982
 Associated Italian American Charities Award for Outstanding Service, November 1982
 Pima County," Arizona Award of Appreciation", April 1982
 "Robert F. Kennedy Lectureship Award", University Association of Emergency Medicine, 1982
 "President", American Trauma Society, 1982-1984
 Public Service Helicopter Technology Transfer Advisory Group, "National Aeronautics and Space Administration", 1983-1989
 Appreciation Award for Services Rendered, Department of Justice," Federal Bureau of Investigation", December 1983
 Editorial Board, "Disaster Medicine" Journal, 1983-1990
 Editorial Board, "The American Journal of Emergency Medicine"  1983-1990
 Certificate of Appreciation, National Committee for Employer Support of National Guard and Reserves, June 1984
 "Andrew White Medal, Loyola University," March 1984
 Award for Public Service,National Highway Traffic Safety Administration, May 1984
 Member, Advisory Board, National Spinal Cord Injury Hotline, 1984-1988
 Editorial Board, "Trauma Quarterly," 1984-1990
 "Honor Award and Gold Key Recipient", University of Maryland, School of Medicine, May 10, 1986
 Civic Achievement Award, Engineering Society of Baltimore, April 23, 1986
 Editor, "Journal of the World Association for Emergency and Disaster Medicine," 1986-1989
 AAMC Award, Group on Public Affairs, October 1986
 "Resolution, State Senate of Maryland, In Recognition of MIEMSS Performance in Amtrak-Conrail Train Accident," 1987
 "1987 Stanley W. Gustafson Leadership Award, Highway Users Federation", November 4, 1987
 Publication Design Award, "The System Saving Lives," Noble Steed Associates, Inc 1987
 Award for Increasing Public Awareness of Red Cross Response to Amtrak Disaster, "American Red Cross", January 4, 1987
 "Awarded Honorary Presidency, Pan American Trauma Society", 1988
 Honors Award, The Maryland Speech-Language-Hearing Association, 1988
 Cited as one of the "150 People Who Shape the Way We Live." Baltimore Sun, 1988
 "Marylander of the Year Award". The Maryland Colonial Society, 1988
 1988 Powell Lecturer, University of Maryland Dental School, 1988
 Elected to the "Hall of Fame" and Honorary Membership, Eastern Association for the Surgery of Trauma, 1989
 "Public Service Award, The American Trauma Association", 1989
 Editorial Board, "Emergency Medicine News," 1989-1991
 Resolution in Appreciation, The Fire Chiefs Council, Regional Planning Council, 1989
 Plaque in Recognition of Exemplary Performance. The Fire Chief's Committee of the Regional Planning Council, 1989
 "Certificate of Appreciation, American Red Cross", 1989
 "Man of the Year Award" The Arlene Rosenbloom Wyman Guild, 1989
 Clinical Professor of Medicine, College of Medicine, The Pennsylvania State University, Hershey, Pennsylvania 1980- 1991
 Professor of Thoracic and Cardiovascular Surgery, University of Maryland School of Medicine, Baltimore, Maryland 1960 - 1991

Personal life
He was born in Layton, Utah on July 25, 1917. Cowley was the son of a pharmacist William Wallace Cowley, his family's first college-educated member, who was the founder of Kowley Drugs, a drugstore on Main Street in Layton, Utah. Cowley's mother, Alta Louise Adams, was a self-taught painter and mother of five boys. Cowley was from the country, where he enjoyed riding horses and farming.

Cowley quit medical school at the University of Maryland because of homesickness for family and country life. Upon hearing this, the Dean of the Medical School raced to the bus station, found young Cowley, and offered to let him live in his home if Cowley returned to his studies.

Cowley was married to Roberta Cowley, a speech-and-language pathologist from the University of Virginia. Cowley had a son, R Adams Cowley II, who was born three weeks prior to his own death, and a daughter, Kay Cowley Pace, a teacher, from a prior marriage. Cowley's son R Adams Cowley II, an Eagle Scout, graduated from the Gilman School in Baltimore, Maryland, Vanderbilt University; Georgetown University, MS, Georgetown School of Medicine, 2020.

An amateur oil painter, Cowley donated one of his finest paintings, "Winterscape," during the first Shock Trauma Gala.

Spencer Adams, Cowley's uncle, played professional baseball with the New York Yankees.

Cowley was passionate about classical music, his favorite composer being Mozart.

Though he could have afforded a large house from his earnings as a doctor, Cowley lived in an efficient apartment covered with books, some of which he even kept inside its stove.

Cowley worked 16-hour days, seven days a week, to bring his vision of creating trauma medicine to fruition, and sometimes, he would even sleep on hospital x-ray tables. One Christmas, University of Maryland carpenters, presented Cowley with an 8-foot orange handmade bench so he would stop that practice.

Cowley joked that he missed seven sabbaticals. He refused to take vacations for almost 50 years so that his staff could be home with their families on holidays.

After Cowley's death, his personal and professional papers, awards, and memorabilia were requested by and donated to the University of Utah Marriott Library, where he was named one of "Utah's Heroes." He was a member of the Church of Jesus Christ of Latter-day Saints.

Cowley died suddenly at home on October 27, 1991. He is buried in Arlington National Cemetery.

Cowley's first name
One of Cowley's grandfathers, Utah State Senator Rufus Adams, had yearned for years for a namesake grandson named Rufus. One of Senator Adams's daughters, Cowley's mother, Alta Louise, half-heartedly agreed. However, at the birth of Cowley, though his mother started to write "Rufus," she stopped after writing "R [with no period] Adams Cowley." Cowley's official first name became simply "R," and he insisted that it be written without a period after it.

Media portrayal

Cowley is the subject of the 1982 television film Shocktrauma, in which he is portrayed by William Conrad. This made for Public Broadcast Service TV was sponsored by General Foods.

See also
 Trauma center

References

External links

1917 births
1991 deaths
Latter Day Saints from Utah
American traumatologists
Burials at Arlington National Cemetery
University of Michigan fellows
University of Maryland School of Medicine faculty
Latter Day Saints from Maryland
Latter Day Saints from Michigan
United States Army Medical Corps officers